James Newton Ashmore (November 11, 1878 – April 26, 1944) was an American football, basketball and baseball coach and college athletics administrator. He served as the head football coach at the Washington Agricultural College and School of Science—now known as Washington State University—(1903), Millikin University (1904–1906, 1909–1913), Western Maryland College—now known as McDaniel College–(1907–1908), and DePauw University (1922–1924), compiling a career college football record of 61–46–9. Ashmore was also the head basketball coach at Washington Agricultural (1904–1905), Millikin (1905–1907, 1909–1914), the University of Colorado at Boulder (1914–1917), the University of Iowa (1920–1922), DePauw (1923–1924) and the University of North Carolina at Chapel Hill (1926–1931), tallying a career college basketball mark of 178–117. In addition, he was the head baseball coach at Washington Agricultural (1904), Millikin (1905–1906, 1910–1914, 1940), Colorado, (1915–1917), Iowa (1920–1922), DePauw (1923–1924) and North Carolina (1927–1931).

Coaching career
Ashmore was the eighth head coach for the Washington State Cougars football team and held the position for the 1903 season. His coaching record at Washington State was 3–3–2.

Ashmore was the head coach at Western Maryland for the 1907 and 1908 seasons. While there, he compiled a 9–8–3 record.

Late life and death
Ashmore was elected the township assessor of Decatur, Illinois as a Republican. He died on April 26, 1944, at the Veteran's Hospital in Danville, Illinois, following a illness of ten weeks.

Head coaching record

Football

Basketball

References

External links
 

1878 births
1944 deaths
Baseball first basemen
Baseball players from Illinois
College men's basketball head coaches in the United States
Colorado Buffaloes athletic directors
Colorado Buffaloes baseball coaches
Colorado Buffaloes men's basketball coaches
DePauw Tigers baseball coaches
DePauw Tigers football coaches
DePauw Tigers men's basketball coaches
Illinois Fighting Illini baseball players
Iowa Hawkeyes baseball coaches
Iowa Hawkeyes football coaches
Iowa Hawkeyes men's basketball coaches
McDaniel Green Terror football coaches
Millikin Big Blue baseball coaches
Millikin Big Blue football coaches
Millikin Big Blue men's basketball coaches
North Carolina Tar Heels baseball coaches
North Carolina Tar Heels men's basketball coaches
Washington State Cougars baseball coaches
Washington State Cougars football coaches
Washington State Cougars men's basketball coaches
Educators from Illinois
Illinois Republicans
People from Washington County, Illinois
Sportspeople from Decatur, Illinois
Coaches of American football from Illinois
Baseball coaches from Illinois
Basketball coaches from Illinois